Esteban Óscar Fuertes (born 26 December 1972) is an Argentine former footballer.

Club career
In July 1999, Fuertes was purchased for £2.3m by Jim Smith, manager of Derby County in England. He scored two early goals, the winner against Everton in the league and another against Swansea City in the League Cup. However, weeks later, he was refused entry back into Britain when immigration officials discovered that his Italian passport was forged. Derby were able to sell him on to Lens in France for £2.8m.

Fuertes retired from professional football on 25 June 2012 in a match against Banfield scoring two goals. A year following his retirement, Fuertes signed a six-month contract for Bolivian side Sport Boys Warnes which had been recently promoted to the Liga de Fútbol Profesional Boliviano. He officially retired on 6 December 2013 after 11 appearances and 3 goals scored for the club.

International career 
On 20 May 2009 Fuertes made his international debut in a friendly match against Panama aged 36, making him the oldest player ever to make his debut for the Argentina national team. The Argentina team made up of players based in the Primera División Argentina won the game 3–1.

References

External links
Statistics at Irish Times
BDFA profile 
Esteban Fuertes – Argentine Primera statistics at Fútbol XXI  

Living people
1972 births
Argentine footballers
Argentine expatriate footballers
Argentina international footballers
Argentine Primera División players
Club Atlético Independiente footballers
El Porvenir footballers
Club Atlético Los Andes footballers
Club Atlético Platense footballers
Racing Club de Avellaneda footballers
Club Atlético Colón footballers
Club Atlético River Plate footballers
Premier League players
Derby County F.C. players
RC Lens players
Ligue 1 players
La Liga players
CD Tenerife players
Club Deportivo Universidad Católica footballers
Sportspeople from Buenos Aires Province
Expatriate footballers in England
Expatriate footballers in France
Expatriate footballers in Chile
Expatriate footballers in Spain
Expatriate football managers in Chile
Argentine expatriate sportspeople in France
Argentine expatriate sportspeople in Spain
Argentine expatriate sportspeople in England
Association football forwards
Argentine football managers
Club Atlético Colón managers